The following is a list of all suspensions and fines enforced in the National Hockey League (NHL) during the 2017–18 NHL season. It lists which players or coaches of what team have been punished for which offense and the amount of punishment they have received.

Based on each player's average annual salary, divided by number of days in the season (186) for first time offenders and games (82) for repeat offenders, salary will be forfeited for the term of their suspension. Players' money forfeited due to suspension or fine goes to the Players' Emergency Assistance Fund, while money forfeited by coaches, staff or organizations as a whole go to the NHL Foundation.

Suspensions
† - suspension covered at least one 2017 NHL preseason game

‡ - suspension covered at least one 2018 postseason game

 - Player was considered a repeat offender under the terms of the Collective Bargaining Agreement (player had been suspended in the 18 months prior to this suspension)

Notes
1. All figures are in US dollars.
2. As players are not paid salary in the preseason or postseason, no fines are generated for games lost due to suspension during those periods.
3. Desjardins was signed to a professional try out with the New York Rangers at the time of the incident.
4. Cogliano had played a total of 830 consecutive games from the start of his career prior to the suspension.

Fines
Players can be fined up to 50% of one day's salary, up to a maximum of $10,000.00 for their first offense, and $15,000.00 for any subsequent offenses (player had been fined in the 12 months prior to this fine). Coaches, non-playing personnel, and teams are not restricted to such maximums.

Fines for players/coaches fined for diving/embellishment are structured uniquely and are only handed out after non-publicized warnings are given to the player/coach for their first offense. For more details on diving/embellishment fines:

 For coach incident totals, each citation issued to a player on his club counts toward his total.
 All figures are in US dollars.

Fines listed in italics indicate that was the maximum allowed fine.

Notes
1. All figures are in US dollars.
2. Andersen was issued his first citation following an incident on November 24, 2017.
3. Cousins was issued his first citation following an incident on January 4, 2018.
4. Marchand was issued his first citation following an incident on November 29, 2017.
5. Matheson was issued his first citation following an incident on January 7, 2018.

Further reading

See also 
 2016–17 NHL suspensions and fines
 2018–19 NHL suspensions and fines
 2017 in sports
 2018 in sports
 2017–18 NHL season
 2017–18 NHL transactions

References

External links
NHL Collective Bargaining Agreement

Suspension and Fines
National Hockey League suspensions and fines